Guy Kokou Acolatse (born 28 April 1942) is a Togolese former professional footballer who played as an attacking midfielder. He was the first Black professional footballer to play in Germany.

Career
Acolatse made his debut for the Togo national team at the age of 17. He joined one of the two major clubs in Lomé, the Togolese capital, from Kpalimé. He was courted by French and Belgian clubs but rejected their offers.

German coach Otto Westphal, who had coached the Togo national team and who had become FC St. Pauli coach, convinced Acolatse to join the club in August 1963. The club played in the Regionalliga Nord, which was the German second tier at the time. He made his debut in a 4–1 league win against Altona 93. Acolatse spent three years at the clubs, making 43 appearances and scoring six goals. He then played a further three years for HSV Barmbek-Uhlenhorst, another Hamburg-based side. He returned to FC St. Pauli in 1970 to play for the club's second team, where he played for three years, occasionally helping out the first team.

Personal life
Acolatse moved to Saint-Denis, Paris in 1980 where he coached the third team of Paris Saint-Germain and worked at Ford. As of April 2020, he was retired and still lived in the Paris suburb where he trained children in an honorary capacity.

References

Living people
1942 births
Togolese footballers
Association football midfielders
Togo international footballers
Regionalliga players
FC St. Pauli players
FC St. Pauli II players
21st-century Togolese people